Bishop Allen Academy; officially known as Bishop Allen Academy Catholic Secondary School (alternatively as Bishop Allen, Bishop Allen Academy CSS, BAA, BAACSS, BA, Allen),  is a high school in Toronto, Ontario, Canada managed by the Toronto Catholic District School Board, formerly the Metropolitan Separate School Board. It is one of the board's 31 secondary schools and houses about 1643 students as of the 2017-18 year and currently ranked 88 out of 740 schools in the Fraser Institute report card. The school building opened in 1963 as Kingsmill Secondary School (1963-1988) by the Etobicoke Board of Education, which later became the Toronto District School Board, and has leased the campus to the MSSB/TCDSB since 1989. It is located in the Queensway – Humber Bay neighbourhood of Etobicoke.

History 

The Bishop Allen Academy site is situated on  acres on a ravine that runs parallel to the Mimico Creek. It was part of the original piece of land surveyed in the township of Etobicoke in 1793 by local developer Frederick Davidson which was set aside for the use of the government mill or the King's Mill located at the first rapids upstream from Lake Ontario and was later used for his 'Brookwood' estate. The house was eventually demolished in 1961 and the Etobicoke Board of Education constructed Kingsmill Secondary School (named after the Old 'King's' Mill) in 1962 designed by the architectural firm of Gordon S. Adamson & Associates on the 721 Royal York Road building just south of Royal York Collegiate Institute (now used today as Etobicoke School of the Arts). The school was opened in October 1963.

During a period of reorganization of the Catholic school boards after the extension of full funding to Catholic secondary school, Kingsmill was one of three schools to be declared surplus by the Etobicoke Board of Education in June 1988 because of low enrollment and was transferred to the Metropolitan Separate School Board on July 1, 1988 which reopened the school a year later in September 1989 as Bishop Allen Academy. The original school was composed of 135 students under its founding principal Pat Gravelle. The area had previously been served by Etobicoke's first Catholic secondary schools in Our Lady of Sorrows Parish; Michael Power school for boys and St. Joseph's, Islington for girls which, having combined, moved from the area in the 1990s. Before it opened, it was used at one point as the temporary home of De La Salle College for its 850 students in early 1989 because of the flood caused by student vandalism in their own building.

Bishop Allen Academy underwent four additions and renovations in 1991, 2000, 2005, and 2018. The new chapel and an under-used exterior courtyard was enclosed with a roof to expand the existing ground floor cafeteria was designed by the architect, Scott Morris. Most recently the school's chimney is being demolished because of falling bricks.

Many immigrant families had arrived in Toronto during the post war years including many Eastern Europeans, especially Byzantine Catholic Ukrainians, who made Etobicoke their home and whose descendants form a large part of the student body at Bishop Allen.  The school is one of few in Toronto that has continued to grow during a period of falling student numbers as many families have moved to Toronto's suburbs.

The school is named after Bishop Francis Allen, an auxiliary Bishop in the Archdiocese of Toronto and former pastor of local Etobicoke Parish Our Lady of Sorrows which serves Bishop Allen Academy.  Bishop Allen was instrumental, together with fellow Auxiliary Bishop Francis Marocco and Archbishop Philip Pocock, in the Archdiocese of Toronto's 1960s campaign to establish and enlarge Catholic Secondary Schools in the Archdiocese.

With the former Kingsmill building built just for 717 students, the school has 30 portables on site to handle the growing student population. In 2008, health concerns and damp summer weather on all the portables that contained mould from one of the four forced to relocate Grade 10 students to the former St. Peter (now Monsignor Fraser College Annex) for one semester. The board installed three computer labs on that site.

Overview
Bishop Allen Academy educates just under 1700 students with over 100 teachers.  Recently, the school has taken moves to becoming a more academic-focused school, including adding several advanced placement (AP) classes. It also supports a French Immersion and Extended French program, as well as a gifted program called SAGE (Service, Awareness, Giftedness, Experience).

Originally using a blue and grey colouring scheme to match the outside of the building and as a contrast to the red and black of local high school Father John Redmond, the school has recently moved to a red and black colouring scheme. The Canadian former style student council led by a 'Premier' with 'Ministers' was also changed to an American style council with a 'President', and later changed to the Bishop Allen Student Government (STUGO). Bishop Allen Stugo has its own website www.bishopallenstugo.com

On the Report Card of Ontario's Secondary Schools, Bishop Allen Academy ranked 58/725 (as of March 2013), and within the past five years, the average ranking was 70/691. These rankings are based on the Literacy Test and the EQAO results. Bishop Allen Academy has received an overall rating of 8.1 out of 10 (in 2012).

Building 
Bishop Allen Academy has a two-storey 77,705 sq. ft. campus leasing the space formerly held by Kingsmill S.S. in an 11.5 acre land. It currently has 28 classrooms, four science labs, an expanded cafetorium formerly used by a quadrangle, a double gym that can be partitioned, three art rooms, a new library, guidance/administrative area, and a chapel. The school originally had a full-sized 400m race track and soccer/football field, but it was partially covered away with 30 portables; it has since been replaced with a lackluster 300m race track/soccer pitch.

Feeder schools 
 Josyf Cardinal Slipyj Elementary School (Byzantine Rite)
 St. Mark's Catholic Elementary School
 St. Pius X Catholic Elementary School
 Our Lady of Sorrows Elementary School
 All Saints Catholic Elementary School
 St. Demetrius Elementary School (Byzantine Rite)
 Holy Angels Catholic Elementary School
 St. Vincent De Paul (French Program)
 St. Louis Catholic Elementary School
 Our Lady of Peace Catholic School

Notable alumni 

 Jason Agnew, television personality and former host of Global TV's Brain Battle
Nikki Benz, adult film actress and director
 Anna Cyzon, television personality
 Denys Drozdyuk, winner of So You Think You Can Dance Canada
 Justin Rutledge, singer

References

External links
 Bishop Allen Academy

Toronto Catholic District School Board
High schools in Toronto
Education in Etobicoke
Catholic secondary schools in Ontario
Educational institutions established in 1989
Bill 30 schools
1989 establishments in Ontario